Berenguer Ramon or Berengar Raymond might refer to:

Berenguer Ramon I, Count of Barcelona "The Hunchback", (1005–1035)
Berenguer Ramon II, Count of Barcelona "The Fratricide", (1050s–1090s)
Berenguer Ramon, Count of Provence (1115–1144)

See also
 Ramon Berenguer (disambiguation)